The 1997 Kroger St. Jude International was a men's tennis tournament played on indoor hard courts at the Racquet Club of Memphis in Memphis, Tennessee in the United States and was part of the Championship Series of the 1997 ATP Tour. The tournament ran from February 17 through February 23, 1997. First-seeded  Michael Chang won the singles title.

Finals

Singles

 Michael Chang defeated  Todd Woodbridge 6–3, 6–4
 It was Chang's 1st title of the year and the 27th of his career.

Doubles

 Ellis Ferreira /  Patrick Galbraith defeated  Rick Leach /  Jonathan Stark 6–3, 3–6, 6–1
 It was Ferreira's 2nd title of the year and the 5th of his career. It was Galbraith's 2nd title of the year and the 31st of his career.

References

External links
 Official website
 ITF tournament edition details

Kroger St. Jude International
U.S. National Indoor Championships
Kroger St. Jude
Kroger St. Jude International
Kroger St. Jude International